Tokyo Trial is a Japanese four-part historical drama miniseries that depicts the International Military Tribunal for the Far East. The series was co-directed by Pieter Verhoeff and Rob W. King, and produced by Japanese public broadcaster NHK in a co-production with FATT Productions of the Netherlands and Don Carmody Television of Canada.

The series stars Marcel Hensema, Jonathan Hyde, Paul Freeman, Stephen McHattie, Julian Wadham, Irrfan Khan, and Michael Ironside.

Tokyo Trial premiered on NHK in Japan on 12 December 2016. Thereafter, it was made available on the NHK On-Demand VoD service and subsequently by Netflix. Overseas, the series premiered in 190 countries on Netflix in December 2016. The Netflix broadcast of the series includes subtitles in 20 languages.

Premise
Following the end of the Second World War with the surrender of Japan, an international tribunal of judges from the victorious powers are tasked with determining the fate of Japanese war criminals.

Cast
Judges
 Tim Ahern as Major General Myron C. Cramer (Representing the United States of America) 
 Paul Freeman as The Honourable Lord William D. Patrick (Representing the United Kingdom of Great Britain and Northern Ireland) 
 Serge Hazanavicius as Henri Bernard (Representing the French Republic) 
 Marcel Hensema as Professor Bert V.A. Röling (Representing the Kingdom of Netherlands) 
 Jonathan Hyde as President Sir William Webb (Representing the Commonwealth of Australia) 
 Irrfan Khan as Radhabinod Pal (Representing British India) 
 Stephen McHattie as Edward Stuart McDougall (Representing the Dominion of Canada) 
 David Tse as Mei Ju-ao (Representing the Republic of China) 
 Julian Wadham as Sir Erima H. Northcroft (Representing New Zealand) 
 Bert Matias as Colonel and former Supreme Court Associate Justice of the Philippine Commonwealth Delfín Jaranilla (Representing the United States Commonwealth of the Philippine Islands)
 Kestutis Stasys Jakstas as Major General I.M. Zaryanov (Representing the Soviet Union)
 William Hope as John P. Higgins (Representing the United States of America) 
Other cast
 Stacy Keach as the narrator
 Michael Ironside as General Douglas MacArthur
 Hadewych Minis as Eta Harich-Schneider
 Shinya Tsukamoto as Michio Takeyama

Production
The miniseries was proposed by Japanese public broadcaster NHK. The company signed a co-production deal with FATT Productions. At the OMDC’s International Financing Forum at TIFF 2013, NHK and FATT officials discussed co-producing the series with Don Carmody Television. Netflix gained streaming rights for the series by providing financing through Don Carmody Television.

Filming
The series was filmed in Japan and Lithuania in 2015.

Awards and nominations

References

External links
 

Japanese television miniseries
Pacific War films
World War II television drama series
International Military Tribunal for the Far East
Television shows set in Tokyo
English-language television shows
2016 Japanese television series debuts
2016 Japanese television series endings
NHK television dramas
Films directed by Pieter Verhoeff
Films directed by Rob W. King
Films about capital punishment